Kristina Barrois (born 30 September 1981) is a retired German tennis player.

Barrois won 15 singles and 16 doubles titles on the ITF Circuit in her career. On 9 May 2011, she reached her best singles ranking of world No. 57. On 20 February 2012, she peaked at No. 55 in the doubles rankings.

Early life
Barrois began playing tennis at the age of nine in 1991 when she took the sport up herself and began to play at a tennis club. She completed her training as a government inspector at the Saarland Ministry of Justice before turning professional in 2005.

Career
Barrois was trained by Patrick Schmidt, and later by Andreas Spaniol, and her stamina-trainer was the footballer Bernd Franke.

She played in the German Fed Cup team in 2006, losing her singles match to Li Na, and also losing her doubles match. In the same year, she won the German Tennis Championship. She also qualified for the main draws of the Wimbledon Championships and the US Open. At Wimbledon, she lost to Shenay Perry. At the US Open, she lost to the world No. 1, Amélie Mauresmo.

On 14 December 2008, she won her second German Tennis Championship, with a win in the final against the unseeded Lydia Steinbach.

In 2009, she started off well as she qualified for Auckland but lost to up-and-coming Russian teenager Anastasia Pavlyuchenkova. She then fell in the qualifying round of the Hobart event to British player Melanie South. She also reached the first round of the Australian Open, where she pushed the fourth-seeded Russian Elena Dementieva, but eventually lost in three sets. In February, she reached the second round in Memphis, but fell short against former world No. 30, Michaëlla Krajicek. In March, she played an ITF event where she lost in the quarterfinals to British player Katie O'Brien. At the Premier Mandatory event in Indian Wells, she beat Alizé Cornet in the second round, but lost to Ágnes Szávay in the next round. She reached the second round of the French Open, where Victoria Azarenka beat her and of the US Open, where she lost to Dinara Safina.

In 2010, she reached the second round on the Australian Open, losing to Samantha Stosur. She qualified for her first ever final in a WTA tournament, the Internationaux de Strasbourg, which Maria Sharapova won in straight sets. She reached the second round of Wimbledon, being knocked out by Justine Henin.

In 2011, she reached the second round of the Australian Open, this time losing to Anastasia Pavlyuchenkova.

After losing to Lucie Hradecká at the Luxembourg Open in October 2014, Barrois announced her retirement from professional tennis.

WTA career finals

Singles: 2 (2 runner-ups)

Doubles: 4 (1 title, 3 runner-ups)

ITF Circuit finals

Singles: 22 (15–7)

Doubles: 30 (16–14)

Grand Slam performance timelines

Singles

Doubles

References

External links

 
 
 

1981 births
Living people
People from Neunkirchen (German district)
German female tennis players
German people of French descent
20th-century German women
21st-century German women